Music Revelation Ensemble is the eponymous second album by James Blood Ulmer's Music Revelation Ensemble featuring saxophonist David Murray, bassist Jamaaladeen Tacuma and drummer Ronald Shannon Jackson, recorded in 1988 and released on the Japanese DIW label.

Reception
Allmusic awarded the album 4 stars.

Track listing
All compositions by James Blood Ulmer except as indicated
 "Bodytalk" - 12:43   
 "Playtime" - 11:33   
 "Nisa" - 11:53   
 "Street Bride" - 8:45   
 "Blues for David" - 5:01   
 "Burn!" (Ronald Shannon Jackson, David Murray, Kazunori Sugiyama, Jamaaladeen Tacuma, James Blood Ulmer) - 8:41

Personnel
James Blood Ulmer - guitar
David Murray - tenor saxophone
Jamaaladeen Tacuma - electric bass
Ronald Shannon Jackson - drums

References 

1988 albums
James Blood Ulmer albums
DIW Records albums